The Caloocan Sports Complex is an 3,000-seater indoor sporting arena located in Bagumbong, Caloocan, Philippines.

Built and operated by the Caloocan city government, the coliseum has hosted games of the ASEAN Basketball League (ABL), the Philippine Super Liga, and the Maharlika Pilipinas Basketball League as the home arena of the Caloocan Supremos. It has also been the venue of boxing events, conventions, concerts and sports festivals.

Notable events
 Tawag ng Tanghalan 3: Ang Huling Tapatan Finale (September 28, 2019)
 Dream Maker Grand Finale (February 12, 2023)

References

Sports venues in Metro Manila
Indoor arenas in the Philippines
Basketball venues in the Philippines
Buildings and structures in Caloocan
Sports venues completed in 2017
2017 establishments in the Philippines
Volleyball venues in the Philippines